This is a list of awards, honors, and memorials to George H. W. Bush, the 41st president of the United States.

Presidential library 

The George H.W. Bush Presidential Library is the nation's tenth presidential library which was built between 1995 and 1997. It contains the presidential and vice presidential papers of Bush and the vice presidential papers of Dan Quayle. It was dedicated on November 6, 1997, and opened to the public shortly thereafter; the architectural firm of Hellmuth, Obata and Kassabaum designed the complex.

The George H.W. Bush Presidential Library is located on a  site on the west campus of Texas A&M University in College Station, Texas, on a plaza adjoining the Presidential Conference Center and the Texas A&M Academic Center. The Library operates under NARA's administration and the provisions of the Presidential Libraries Act of 1955.

The Bush School of Government and Public Service is a graduate public policy school at Texas A&M University in College Station, Texas, which was established in 1995. The graduate school is part of the presidential library complex, and offers four programs — two master's degree programs (Public Service and Administration, and International Affairs) and three certificate programs (Advanced International Affairs, Nonprofit Management, and Homeland Security).

Other memorials
Bush is commemorated on a postage stamp issued by the United States Postal Service on June 12, 2019 at a first day ceremony held at the George H.W. Bush Presidential Library. While stamps honoring deceased individuals are customarily issued only after three years have passed since the death of the person, guidance by the U.S. Citizens’ Stamp Advisory Committee advises that stamps honoring deceased presidents should be issued as soon as possible. The stamp design is centered on a portrait of Bush by Michael J. Deas and is non-denominated.

In 1999, the CIA headquarters in Langley, Virginia, was named George Bush Center for Intelligence in his honor.

The George Bush Intercontinental Airport in Houston, Texas, is named for Bush.

Two elementary schools are named after him:
 George Herbert Walker Bush Elementary School in Addison, Texas, operated by the Dallas Independent School District
 George H. W. Bush Elementary School in Midland, Texas, operated by the Midland Independent School District, opened in 1989.

Scholastic

 University degrees

 Chancellor, visitor, governor, rector and fellowships

Honorary degrees 
George H. W. Bush received honorary degrees from several American and international universities, including:

Awards and honors 
In 1990, Time magazine named him the Man of the Year. In 1991, the U.S. Navy Memorial Foundation awarded Bush its Lone Sailor award for his naval service and his subsequent government service. In 1993, he was made an Honorary Knight Grand Cross of the Order of the Bath by Queen Elizabeth II. In 1995, Poland's President Lech Wałęsa awarded Bush the Grand Cross of the Order of Merit of the Republic of Poland for his support in helping Poland become a democratic state. In December 2001, Hungary's President Ferenc Mádl awarded Bush the Grand Cross with Chain of the Order of Merit of the Republic of Hungary.  In 2009, he received the PGA Tour Lifetime Achievement Award and was inducted into the World Golf Hall of Fame two years later. In 2011, Bush was awarded the Presidential Medal of Freedom—the highest civilian honor in the United States—by President Barack Obama. The  (CVN-77), the tenth and last  supercarrier of the United States Navy, was named for Bush.

In 2004, the John F. Kennedy Library Foundation presented the Profile in Courage Award to Bush and Mount Vernon awarded him its first Cyrus A. Ansary Prize. The Ansary prize was presented in Houston with Ansary, Barbara Lucas, Ryan C. Crocker, dean of the Bush school since January 2010, Barbara Bush, and Curt Viebranz in attendance with the former president. Bush directed $50,000 of the prize to the Bush School of Government and Public Service at Texas A&M University, and $25,000 to fund an animation about the Siege of Yorktown for Mount Vernon. Viebranz and Lucas represented Mount Vernon at the presentation.

Awards

National honors

Foreign honors

See also
 Presidential memorials in the United States

References

Memorials to George H. W. Bush
Bush, George H. W.
Bush, George H. W.
Awards and honors